Dance Moms is an American reality television series that began airing on Lifetime on July 13, 2011. Season 8 premiered on June 4, 2019.

Series overview 

Notes

Episode list

Season 1 (2011)

Season 2 (2012)

Season 3 (2013)

Season 4 (2014)

Season 5 (2015)

Season 6 (2016)

Season 7 (2016–17)

Season 8 (2019)

References 

General references 
 
 
 
 

Dance Moms